George Reynolds "Rinso" Marquette (1924-2008) was a college men's basketball coach and college student affairs administrator. He was the head coach of Lebanon Valley College from 1952 to 1960. He coached Lebanon Valley to a 101-76 record, making one NCAA tournament appearance.  He also served as a student affairs administrator at Lebanon Valley after the conclusion of his coaching career until his retirement in 1990.

In 1942 he graduated from Shamokin High School, where he was captain of the basketball team and student leader of the high school band.

He earned scholarships in music and athletics to Lebanon Valley College in Annville, Pennsylvania.

He enlisted in the US Army on 15 Feb 1943, serving in the European Theater as a radio operator/gunner in the Army Air Corps, flying 34 missions in B-17s and one in a B-24.  He was awarded the Air Medal with three Oak Leaf Clusters.

He resumed his studies at Lebanon Valley College in February 1945, graduating in spring 1948.

Following graduation, he became a history teacher and coach at Myerstown High School.

He also played minor league baseball, finishing as a player/coach in Panama City, Florida in 1954.

Coach Marquette's 1952-53 team defeated Fordham 80-67 in the first round of the 1953 NCAA basketball tournament.  They lost their next game, 83-67, to LSU, led by All American and future Hall of Fame forward Bob Pettit.

Head coaching record

References

1924 births
2008 deaths
Basketball coaches from Pennsylvania
Columbia University alumni
Lebanon Valley Flying Dutchmen baseball players
Lebanon Valley Flying Dutchmen football players
Lebanon Valley Flying Dutchmen men's basketball players
Temple University alumni
American men's basketball players
United States Army personnel of World War II